Doris Gertrud Johanna Stockhausen (née Andreae, born 28 February 1924) is a German music pedagogue. She was the first wife of Karlheinz Stockhausen who dedicated several compositions to her, beginning with Chöre für Doris in 1950 before they were married.

Life 
Doris Gertrud Johanna Andreae was born in Hamburg, the daughter of the shipbuilder Max Andreae (1887–1973) and his wife Emmi Alwine née Blohm (1890–1931). She studied piano at the Musikhochschule Köln, where she met Karlheinz Stockhausen who also studied there. They were engaged in August 1951. Doris was raised Protestant, but converted to Catholicism to prepare for her wedding.

They married—though both had no income yet, and against her family's wishes—on 29 December 1951 in Hamburg, shortly before the composer moved to Paris for studies. Their best men were the Belgian composer and musicologist Karel Goeyvaerts and the magician artist .

In the 1950s, Doris Stockhausen was not only her husband's wife, but also his muse and inspiration. She made it possible for him to focus on his compositions. She accompanied him on several tours, and met friends such as Henri Pousseur, György Ligeti, Cornelius Cardew, Earle Brown, Heinz-Klaus Metzger, David Tudor, Frederic Rzewski, Hugh Davies and Rolf Gehlhaar, whom they often hosted at their home for extended periods.

In the early 1960s, Karlheinz Stockhausen fell in love with the artist Mary Bauermeister but wanted to stay with his family, with four small children. Doris Stockhausen was first willing to live in a ménage à trois. Architect Erich Schneider-Wessling designed a home for them in Kürten, but when it was completed in 1964, Doris Stockhausen remained with the children in Cologne, where the children attended school. In 1965, the couple divorced, and she lived in Cologne as a piano teacher.

Music dedicated to Doris Stockhausen 
Karlheinz Stockhausen dedicated Chöre für Doris to her while they were engaged; several more pieces followed during the 1950s. The last dedication was Vier Sterne weisen Dir den Weg in 1976, meaning their four children as the stars.
 1950: Chöre für Doris
 1950: Drei Lieder
 1950: "Choral"
 1951: Kreuzspiel
 1952: Klavierstück III
 1952: Spiel
 1952: Schlagquartett
 1953: Kontra-Punkte
 1955: Gesang der Jünglinge
 1976: "Vier Sterne weisen Dir den Weg", the fifth piece in Amour

Family 

Doris and Karlheinz Stockhausen had four children: Suja (born 1953), Christel (born 1956), Markus (born 1957), and Majella (born 1961). Markus Stockhausen is a trumpeter and composer in Cologne.

References 

Sources

External links 
 Lisa Quernes sorgt für Aufsehen (in German) Jahrbuch Landesmusikgymnasium Rheinland-Pfalz 2013
 
 

German music educators
People from Cologne
1924 births
Living people